Aftab Ahmed (c. 1934 – 25 December 2013) was a Bangladeshi photojournalist. He served as chief photographer of Bengali newspaper The Daily Ittefaq. He was awarded Ekushey Padak in 2006 by the Government of Bangladesh.

Career
Ahmed started his career as photojournalist in The Daily Ittefaq in 1962. He took photographs during the Liberation War of Bangladesh in 1971.

Personal life
Ahmed was married to Momtaz begum (died 29 June 2010). They had one son Monowar Ahmed and one daughter Afroz Ahmed.

Death
On 24 December 2013 Ahmed was found dead at his house in West Rampura region in Dhaka. According to the police, his hands and legs were tied up and a gag was wrapped around his mouth when his body was found. Dhaka Medical College morgue concluded his death was caused by strangulation in the post-mortem report. On 27 March 2017, 5 people were sentenced to death for his murder.

References

Recipients of the Ekushey Padak in arts
Assassinated Bangladeshi journalists
Bangladeshi photojournalists
Burials at Azimpur Graveyard
Deaths by strangulation
2013 deaths
People from Gangachara Upazila